Dinumma deponens is a moth in the family Noctuidae first described by Francis Walker in 1858. It is found from India across eastern China to Japan, Korea and Thailand. A female specimen was taken in Morganton, Fannin County, in northern Georgia in 2012.

The larvae feed on Albizia species.

References

Moths described in 1858
Calpinae
Moths of Asia
Moths of Japan